54 Armoured Regiment is an armoured regiment of the Indian Army.

Formation 
54 Armoured Regiment was raised on 1 July 2010. It was the first regiment to be equipped with the T-90 tanks at raising.

History 
It is the youngest armoured regiment to have been conferred with a ‘Unit Citation’ within eight years of its raising. The regiment has seen deployment in South Kashmir during abrogation of Article 370 and Section 35A.

The Regiment had the honour of participating in the Republic Day parade and the Army Day parade in 2021.

References

Military units and formations established in 2010
Armoured and cavalry regiments of the Indian Army from 1947